Mario Ardell Monds (born November 10, 1976 in Fort Pierce, Florida) is a former American football defensive tackle in the National Football League for the Cincinnati Bengals and Miami Dolphins.  He played college football at the University of Cincinnati and was drafted in the sixth round of the 2001 NFL Draft by the Washington Redskins. He is the son of former San Francisco 49ers defensive back Wonder Monds.

References

1976 births
Living people
People from Fort Pierce, Florida
Players of American football from Florida
American football defensive tackles
Cincinnati Bearcats football players
Cincinnati Bengals players
Hutchinson Blue Dragons football players
Miami Dolphins players
New England Patriots players